A list of films produced in the United Kingdom in 1970 (see 1970 in film):

See also
1970 in British music
1970 in British radio
1970 in British television
1970 in the United Kingdom

References

External links

1970
Films
Lists of 1970 films by country or language